In Chinese philosophy, earth or soil, is the changing point of the matter. Earth is the third element in the Wu Xing cycle.

Earth is a balance of both yin and yang, the feminine and masculine together. Its motion is centering, and its energy is stabilizing and conserving. It is associated with the colour yellow/ ochre and the planet Saturn, and it lies at the centre of the compass in the Chinese cosmos. It is associated with the turn of each of the four seasons and with damp weather. In Traditional Chinese Medicine, earth governs the Yin, Zang organ the Spleen, and the Yang, Fu organ Stomach, mouth and muscles. Its Primal Spirit is the Yi, and is represented by the Yellow Dragon. Color Yellow, Golden (Sun)

Attributes 

The Wu Xing Earth is associated with the qualities of patience, thoughtfulness, practicality, hard work, and stability. The earth element is also nurturing and seeks to draw all things together with itself, in order to bring harmony, rootedness and stability. Other attributes of the earth element include ambition, stubbornness, responsibility and long-term planning. Its negative emotion is worry and its positive emotion is happiness.

Astrology 

Earth plays an important role in Chinese astrology. In Chinese astrology earth is included in the 10 Heavenly Stems (the five elements in their yin and yang forms), which combine with the 12 Earthly Branches (or Chinese signs of the zodiac), to form the 60 year cycle. Yang earth years end in 8 (e.g. 1998), while Yin earth years end in 9 (e.g. 1999). Earth is the central balance of the elements and therefore lends qualities to all 12 animals as well.

The element earth is associated with the planet Saturn on account of its yellow color. However, some Western astrologers have suggested that the Western associations of Saturn give it greater affinity with the rigid, controlling Chinese element of Metal; while the Chinese conception of earth as a centering, harmonizing element has more in common with the Western notion of the planet Venus.

As I Ching and Feng Shui described, Earth is the center to which all movements tend to go to even if temporarily, that is to say, it can polarize with any of the other movements-elements: Fire, Water, Wood and Metal. These four types of Earth are Earth-of-water (Wet/Cold Earth), Earth-of-Fire (Arid/Hot Earth), Earth-of-Metal (Dry/Hard Earth) and Earth-of-Wood (Loose-Fertile/Warm Earth). 

Yellow, orange, beige and brown colors represent Earth.

Earth governs Ox, Dragon, Goat, and Dog.

Cycle of Wu Xing 

In the controlling cycle, earth controls water by damming or absorbing it; wood can overcome it by breaking it up (by the roots).
 
In the 'insulting' cycle, earth overcomes wood by stagnating its growth or covering it up.

In the constructive cycle, earth is produced by fire's ashes, and then solidifies its minerals to produce metal.

In the consuming cycle, metal makes earth poor by sucking all its minerals, and dries its humidity.

References 

it:Terra (elemento)#Tradizione cinese